The Petrovsky Stadium is on a sports complex that consists of a number of buildings, the stadium is used mostly for football and also for athletics. The Grand Sport Arena of the Petrovsky Sport Complex was the home of FC Zenit and FC Tosno.

The complex also contains another football stadium, Minor Sport Arena (MSA). MSA of Petrovsky in 2022 is used by several teams that compete in lower professional leagues: FC Dynamo Saint Petersburg and FC Zenit-2 Saint Petersburg (selected matches). The capacity of MSA is 2835. The whole complex is located on the Petrograd side in central St. Petersburg on Petrovsky Island; an island in the Malaya Neva River connected to the adjacent Petrogradsky islands through Zhdanovsky bridge. The nearest metro station Sportivnaya is around 150 metres away from the stadium.

Capacity
The Grand Sport Arena of the Petrovsky Sport Complex has a capacity of 20,985 people.

History 
The first stadium at this location was designed by Czech architect Aloise Wejwoda and was built in 1924 - 1925. During World War II the stadium was completely destroyed. In 1957 - 1961 it was completely rebuilt by architects N.V. Baranov, O.I. Guryev and V.M. Fromzel. At that time the capacity was 33,000 seats. Before the 1980 Summer Olympics Petrovsky Stadium went through the reconstruction.

Zenit Saint Petersburg was based at Petrovsky Stadium from 1994 to 2017. Tosno used the Petrovsky Stadium for one season.

Photo gallery

References

External links
Official website
FC Zenit Official Site

Sports venues completed in 1925
FC Zenit Saint Petersburg
Football venues in Russia
Sports venues built in the Soviet Union
Sports venues in Saint Petersburg
Speed skating venues in Russia
1925 establishments in Russia